You may also be looking for ORP Huragan.

 
Huragan is a Polish historical film directed by Józef Lejtes. It was released in 1928.

References

External links
 

1928 films
Polish historical films
1920s Polish-language films
Polish black-and-white films
Polish silent films
1920s historical films